Quincy Center station is an intermodal transit station in Quincy, Massachusetts. It is a transfer station between the MBTA Red Line subway, MBTA Commuter Rail's Old Colony Lines and Greenbush Line, and a number of MBTA bus routes. It is located between Hancock Street and Burgin Parkway in the Quincy Center district. Opened in 1971, the station was covered by a large parking garage which was closed in 2012 due to structural problems. A project to remove and replace the garage is under way. 

All buses and trains are accessible from the Hancock Street entrance. Access from Burgin Parkway was formerly through the garage; a new accessible entrance will be added as part of the current project.

History

Old Colony Railroad

The Old Colony Railroad opened its main line from South Boston to Plymouth on November 10, 1845. Quincy station was located at Quincy Square behind the town hall. New station buildings – low brick structures very similar to the extant building at  – were built at Quincy and Atlantic in 1900, with shelters serving the line's two tracks. Service on the former Old Colony lines, operated by the New Haven Railroad since 1893, ended on June 30, 1959. The Quincy depot was later demolished.

Red Line
The 1926 Report on Improved Transportation Facilities and 1945–47 Coolidge Commission Report recommended the Cambridge–Dorchester line receive a branch to Braintree along the Old Colony right-of-way. In May 1966, the MBTA began construction on the South Shore Line branch of the Cambridge–Dorchester line (which was renamed the Red Line in 1967). 

The line was intended to be completed to Braintree by May 1969. Although the South Shore Line was planned to extend to Braintree and possibly even to Holbrook or Brockton, it was temporarily terminated at Quincy Center due to disagreements about station locations and other issues.

The other two stations had large surface lots, but due to limited land availability, Quincy Center station included a 5-story parking garage located over the two tracks and single island platform, with 700 spots for Red Line riders and 200 spots for local shoppers. The $5.877 million station, located a block north of the Old Colony station site, was designed Samuel Glaser Associates and built by J.F. White. The station signs included interpretive panels with historical images and information - a design soon copied at other MBTA stations. The new stations required a double fare to be paid on entry and an exit fare upon leaving; this was also briefly put in place on the north end of the Haymarket North Extension.

Further construction began in 1977, and the line was extended to Braintree on March 22, 1980. The exit fare was abolished from Quincy Center north at this time, though Braintree and Quincy Adams had the double fare until 2007.

Commuter Rail

In November 1987, the MBTA indicated plans to repair the parking garage. In 1991, the MBTA installed two elevators, making the station accessible for the first time.

In 1990, the MBTA began construction on the restoration of parts of the former Old Colony system. A single commuter rail track was built through the west side of the station, with a full-length high-level side platform west of the track. Service began on the Middleborough/Lakeville Line and Kingston/Plymouth Line on September 29, 1997. The Greenbush Line opened on October 31, 2007, with some of its trains stopping at Quincy Center as well.

Some seasonal CapeFLYER trains stopped at Quincy Center in 2013 and 2014, but did not starting with the 2015 season due to schedule changes. In January 2018, Quincy Center was changed from Zone 1 to Zone 1A (with a subway-equivalent fare to South Station on commuter rail trains) as mitigation for the closure of Wollaston station for reconstruction. This continued after Wollaston reopened in 2019, as parking was then limited at North Quincy station due to garage construction. With the North Quincy project near completion, Quincy Center reverted to Zone 1 on July 1, 2021.

Garage closure and replacement

On July 4, 2012, the Quincy Center parking garage was closed indefinitely due to structural issues. Built in 1970-71, the garage is the oldest anywhere on the MBTA system. Red Line, MBTA Commuter Rail, and MBTA bus service to the station continue as normal; however, the Burgin Parkway entrance is no longer handicapped accessible.

In March 2016, the city released preliminary plans for a replacement structure, paid for by a $970,000 federal grant. Three structures would be built: a new garage with the same number of spaces, a "justice center" with a new Quincy District Court, and an office building for the National Park Service and its bus shuttle to Adams National Historical Park. The garage would have street-level retail locations. The busways would be relocated to the Burgin Parkway side and a roof added; the kiss-and-ride dropoff lane would remain on the Hancock Street side. The project is estimated to cost $52 million; the city proposes to use $10 million in state money approved in 2014, $20 million in federal grants, and $22 million from a private partner who would operate the facility for several decades. No city money will be used to pay for the project.

In July and August 2016, bracing was installed in the closed garage to stabilize it while the new structure was designed. During September 2016, the USDOT granted $4.2 million for planning the new station. In October 2016, Quincy mayor Thomas Koch announced that the courthouse part of the proposal would be withdrawn due to local opposition and a lack of available state funds, but planning for the station and office building would continue. The MBTA will remove the former garage, replace the existing elevator, and add an accessible entrance to Burgin Parkway as a $25 million project lasting from July 2017 to December 2018, with future air rights development to come later. A $67.867 million contract (which also included the full renovation of Wollaston station) was approved on June 19, 2017.

Bus connections

Through the first half of the 20th century, Quincy was served by a number of Eastern Massachusetts Street Railway streetcar and bus lines, with both local routes and through service as far as Providence, Rhode Island. Some routes continued through Quincy to Fields Corner via Hancock Street and Neponset Avenue. After a legal battle, the MBTA acquired the remaining Eastern Mass lines on March 30, 1968. When Quincy Center opened in 1971, most of the Fields Corner routes were cut back to the new terminus.

Quincy Center is now the terminal of 15 MBTA bus routes which provide local and short-distance intercity service. All routes loop through the surface parking lot and into a dedicated busway on the Hancock Street side of the station; there is no bus service on the Burgin parkway side.

: Quincy Center station–
: Quincy Center station–Squantum
: Quincy Center station–
: Germantown–Quincy Center station
: Quincy Center station– via West Quincy
: Hough's Neck–Quincy Center station
: Quincy Center station–Ashmont station via Wollaston station
: Hingham Depot–Quincy Center station
: Fort Point–Quincy Center station
: East Weymouth–Quincy Center station
: Weymouth Landing–Quincy Center station
: Montello station–Quincy Center station
: South Shore Plaza–Quincy Center station
: Holbrook/Randolph station–Quincy Center station
: Quincy Center station–

Under plans for redeveloping the station site, the busway would be relocated to the Burgin Parkway side of the station.

Station layout

References

External links

MBTA - Quincy Center
MBTA - Quincy Center station improvements
 Burgin Parkway entrance from Google Maps Street View

Buildings and structures in Quincy, Massachusetts
Red Line (MBTA) stations
Railway stations in Norfolk County, Massachusetts
Railway stations in the United States opened in 1971
Stations along Old Colony Railroad lines
MBTA Commuter Rail stations in Norfolk County, Massachusetts
1971 establishments in Massachusetts